City of Westminster Football Club was a football club based in Westminster, England.

History
During the 1904–05 season, City of Westminster joined the London League, finishing bottom of the First Division in their only season in the league. Following their spell in the London League, the club joined the Southern Suburban League, entering the FA Cup seven times, before the team folded after the outbreak of World War I. The club also entered the FA Amateur Cup during their existence.

Records
Best FA Cup performance: First qualifying round, 1905–06, 1910–11

References

London League (football)
Defunct football clubs in London
Association football clubs disestablished in 1914
1914 disestablishments in England